The Aldershot & District Football League is an English football league comprising teams from north east Hampshire and neighbouring parts of Surrey and Berkshire. It has two divisions the highest of which, the Senior Division, sits at level 13 of the English football league system. Teams may be promoted to the Hampshire Premier League Division One. The current champions are Hartley Wintney 'A'.

History
The league began as the Aldershot Senior League, founded in 1894 for military teams, and introduced a 'Civilian' division of three teams in 1912–13.
After World War I the league featured civilian, military and works teams in the same division.  Today it consists solely of civilian teams.

Member clubs 2020–21
Senior Division
Abbey Rangers Reserves
Deepcut Community
Headley FC Reserves
Fleet Spurs 'A'
Frimley Select
Ropley FC
Rushmoor Community
Sandhurst Sports
Wey Valley
Yateley United 'A'

Division One
AFC Laffans
Farnborough North End
Four Marks
Hartland Athletic
Letef Select
Mytchett Athletic
Normandy FC
Rushmoor Community Reserves
Wey Valley Reserves
Yateley United 'B'

Recent champions

References

External links
 Aldershot Divisional FA

 
Football leagues in England
Football in Hampshire
Sport in Aldershot